Hydrodimerization is an organic reaction that couples two alkenes to give a symmetrical hydrocarbon.  The reaction is often implemented electrochemically; in that case the reaction is called electrodimerization. The reaction can also be induced with samarium diiodide, a one-electron reductant.

Hydrodimerization is the basis of the Monsanto adiponitrile synthesis:
2CH2=CHCN  +  2e−  + 2H+   →  NCCH2CH2CH2CH2CN

The reaction applies to a number electrophilic alkenes (Michael acceptors).

References

Electrochemistry
Industrial processes
Organic chemistry
Chemical synthesis
Chemical processes
Dimers_(chemistry)